Kirat Karō (Gurmukhi: ਕਿਰਤ ਕਰੋ) is one of the three pillars of Sikhism, the others being Naam Japo and Vaṇḍ chakkō. The term means to earn an honest, pure and dedicated living by exercising one's God-given skills, abilities, talents and hard labour for the benefit and improvement of the individual, their family and society at large. This means to work with determination and focus by the sweat of one's brow and not to be lazy and to waste one's life to time. Meanwhile, Simran and dedication to the work of God, not personal gain, should be one's main motivation.

In scripture
In the Guru Granth Sahib, Guru Nanak Dev ji says: 

Other relevant passages:

See also
 Work ethic
 Self-actualization

References

Kirat karo
Economy and religion